Başak İçinözbebek (born February 13, 1994) is a Turkish women's football midfielder currently playing in the Turkish Women's Super League for Fomget GSK with jersey number 7. She was part of the Turkey women's national U-19 team.

Early life 
Başak İçinözbabek was born in Mersin on February 13, 1994. At the age of 10, she began football playing. She is a student of physical education and sports at Bülent Ecevit University in Zonguldak.

Club career 

Başak İçinözbebek obtained her license on February 7, 2008, for her hometown club Mersingüzü Cengiz Topelspor. Her team played the 2008–09 season in the Turkish Women's First League. The next season, they were relegated to the Women's Second League. Başak İçinözbebek transferred to Kdz. Ereğli Belediye Spor in the 2010–11 season. In the 2016–17 season, İçinözbebek transferred to Trabzon İdmanocağı.

İçinözbebek returned to her former club Kdz. Ereğlispor in the 2017–18 season. She captains the team.

In the 2020-21 Turkcell Women's Football League season, she played for the Gaziantep-based club ALG Spor. Her team finished the season at third place.

She transferred to Fomget Dençlik ve Spor in Ankara to paly in the 2021-22 Women's Super League season.

International career 
İçinözbebek was admitted to the Turkey women's national U-19 team, and debuted in the match against Slovakia at the 2012 Kuban Spring Tournament on March 7, 2012. She participated at the 2013 UEFA Women's U-19 Championship First qualifying round – Group 5 matches. She capped 12 times for the women's nationals U-19 team.

She was called up to the Turkey women's national team despite her health problem with severe headache. However, she failed to join the squad.

Career statistics 
.

Honors 
 Turkish Women's First League
 Kdz. Ereğlispor
 Third places (2): 2011–12, 2012–13

 ALG Spor
 Third places (1): 2020-21

References

External links 

1994 births
Living people
Sportspeople from Mersin
Turkish women's footballers
Women's association football midfielders
Trabzon İdmanocağı women's players
Karadeniz Ereğlispor players
ALG Spor players
Turkish Women's Football Super League players
Fomget Gençlik ve Spor players
21st-century Turkish sportswomen